Robert Schuler (or Schuller) may refer to:

Evangelist 

 Robert H. Schuller (1926-2015), American televangelist, pastor, and author
 Robert A. Schuller (born 1954), son of Robert H., American televangelist, pastor and author
 Bobby Schuller (born 1981), son of Robert A., American televangelist and pastor
 Robert P. Shuler (1880–1965), American radio evangelist from Los Angeles

Other 

 Robert C. Schuler (1917–2007), American advertising and public-relations executive, television producer, and writer
 Bob Schuler (1943–2009), Republican Ohio State Senator